Beacon Hill is an unincorporated community in the Rural Municipality of Beaver River No. 622 in the province of Saskatchewan, Canada.

Beaver River No. 622, Saskatchewan
Unincorporated communities in Saskatchewan
Division No. 17, Saskatchewan